Judy Geer (born July 11, 1953) is an American rower. She competed at the 1976 Summer Olympics and the 1984 Summer Olympics.

References

External links
 

1953 births
Living people
American female rowers
Olympic rowers of the United States
Rowers at the 1976 Summer Olympics
Rowers at the 1984 Summer Olympics
Sportspeople from New York City
21st-century American women